This list of former RAF stations includes most of the stations, airfields and administrative headquarters previously used by the Royal Air Force.

The stations are listed under any former county or country name which was appropriate for the duration of operation. It has been stated that RAF stations took their name from the civil parish in which the station headquarters was located, rather than the nearest railway station (e.g., Binbrook has never had a railway station), but there are many exceptions.



British Isles

Chain Home, Chain Home Low, Chain Home Extra Low, ROTOR and tropo-scatter stations 
Notes: Some of the Chain Home Low sites were co-located with the larger Chain Home radars. Chain Home Extra Low equipment was co-located with "Chain Home" and "Chain Home Low" as well as at separate sites, but were of a less permanent nature, usually with mobile equipment.

ROTOR was the post war Radar interception system created from existing radar installations.

NARS, the North Atlantic Radio System, was an extension of the US Distant Early Warning system tropo-scatter communications network.

ACE High provided long-range communications for NATO

Overseas

Europe

Rest of the World

Overseas Royal Flying Corps (WWI) and British Commonwealth Air Training Plan (WWII) airfields

See also
 Advanced Landing Ground – a type of semi-permanent bases in Kent, France, Belgium, Netherlands and occupied Germany
 Air Ministry Experimental Station
 Chain Home – radar defence system developed during the Second World War 
 Class A airfield – airfields constructed to Air Ministry specifications during the Second World War 
 List of Battle of Britain airfields
 List of North African airfields during World War II
 List of Royal Air Force Satellite Landing Grounds
 List of V Bomber dispersal bases

Notes

References

Citations

Bibliography
 
 
 
 

UK former
 
For